Mount Pleasant Township may refer to:

Mount Pleasant Township, Adams County, Pennsylvania
Mount Pleasant Township, Columbia County, Pennsylvania
Mount Pleasant Township, Washington County, Pennsylvania
Mount Pleasant Township, Wayne County, Pennsylvania
Mount Pleasant Township, Westmoreland County, Pennsylvania

Pennsylvania township disambiguation pages

it:Mount Pleasant (Pennsylvania)